Craig Lowe (born 5 November 1961) is a South African cricketer. He played in sixteen first-class and fourteen List A matches from 1985–86 to 1990–91.

References

External links
 

1961 births
Living people
South African cricketers
Boland cricketers
KwaZulu-Natal cricketers
Cricketers from Durban